Megachile auriceps is a species of bee in the family Megachilidae. It was described by Meade-Waldo in 1914.

References

Auriceps
Insects described in 1914